Eduard Gutknecht (born 19 March 1982) is a German former professional boxer who competed from 2006 to 2016. He won the European light-heavyweight title in 2011, making three successful defences before losing it to Jürgen Brähmer in 2013. Gutknecht also challenged for the WBA light-heavyweight title, losing in a rematch against Brähmer in 2016.

In November 2016, he was rushed to a London hospital and had emergency surgery following a losing bout with George Groves. Gutknecht suffered a bleed in the skull and collapsed in the dressing room. His injuries left him unable to walk or talk and he suffered multiple strokes.

Professional record

Gutknecht vs. Braehmer 
On March 12, 2016, Gutknecht faced Juergen Braehmer for the WBA regular light heavyweight title. Braehmer won via unanimous decision, 118-110, 116-111 and 116-111.

Gutknecht vs. Groves 
On November 18, 2016, Gutknecht faced George Groves. Groves won the fight convincingly, winning 119-109, 119 - 109 and 119-110 on the scorecards.
|-
|align="center" colspan=8|30 wins (13 knockouts), 5 losses, 1 draw
|-
|align=center style="border-style: none none solid solid; background: #e3e3e3"|Result
|align=center style="border-style: none none solid solid; background: #e3e3e3"|Record
|align=center style="border-style: none none solid solid; background: #e3e3e3"|Opponent
|align=center style="border-style: none none solid solid; background: #e3e3e3"|Type
|align=center style="border-style: none none solid solid; background: #e3e3e3"|Round
|align=center style="border-style: none none solid solid; background: #e3e3e3"|Date
|align=center style="border-style: none none solid solid; background: #e3e3e3"|Location
|align=center style="border-style: none none solid solid; background: #e3e3e3"|Notes
|-align=center
|Loss
|30-5-1
|align=left| George Groves
| UD || 12 
|2016-11-18 || align=left| London
|align=left|  
|-align=center
|Win
|30-4-1
|align=left| Artem Redko
| KO || 3 
|2016-06-18 || align=left| Niedersachsen
|align=left| 
|-align=center
|Loss
|29-4-1
|align=left| Jürgen Brähmer
| UD || 12 
|2016-03-12 || align=left| Neubrandenburg
|align=left| 
|-align=center
|Win
|29-3-1
|align=left| Arman Torosyan
| TKO || 4 
|2015-11-21 || align=left| Niedersachsen
|align=left| 
|-align=center
|Win
|28-3-1
|align=left| Slavisa Simeunovic
| RTD || 5 
|2015-07-11 || align=left| Brandenburg
|align=left| 
|-align=center
|Win
|27–3-1
|align=left| Steve Kroekel
| TKO || 3 
|2015-05-02 || align=left| Berlin
|align=left| 
|-align=center
|Win
|26–3-1
|align=left| Christian Pawlak
| UD || 8
|2014-11-15 || align=left| Hamburg
|align=left| 
|-align=center
|style="background: #dae2f1"|Draw
|25–3-1
|align=left| Pablo Sosa
| SD || 8
|2014-05-03 || align=left| Berlin
|align=left| 
|-align=center
|Loss
|25–3
|align=left| Dmitry Sukhotsky
| RTD || 4 (12)
|2013-11-23 || align=left| Bamberg, Bayern
|align=left| 
|-align=center
|Win
|25–2
|align=left| Richard Vidal
| UD || 12
|2013-06-08 || align=left| Prenzlauer Berg
|align=left| 
|-align=center
|Loss
|24–2
|align=left| Jürgen Brähmer
| UD || 12
|2013-02-02 || align=left| Prenzlauer Berg
|align=left| 
|-align=center
|Win
|24–1
|align=left| Tony Averlant
| UD || 12 
|2012-03-31 || align=left| Kiel
|align=left| 
|-align=center
|Win
|23–1
|align=left| Vyacheslav Uzelkov
| UD || 12 
|2012-02-04 || align=left| Frankfurt
|align=left| 
|-align=center
|Win
|22–1
|align=left| Lorenzo Di Giacomo
| UD || 12 
|2011-07-16 || align=left| Munich
|align=left| 
|-align=center
|Win
|21–1
|align=left| Danny McIntosh
| TKO || 8 
|2011-05-07 || align=left| Neubrandenburg
|align=left| 
|-align=center
|Win
|20–1
|align=left| Oleksandr Cherviak
| UD || 8 
|2011-02-12 || align=left| Mülheim
|align=left|
|-align=center
|Win
|19–1
|align=left| Michal Bilak
| RTD || 2 
|2010-07-17 || align=left| Schwerin
|align=left|
|-align=center
|Loss
|18–1
|align=left| Robert Stieglitz
| UD || 12 
|2010-04-17 || align=left| Magdeburg
|align=left|
|-align=center
|Won
|18–0
|align=left| Karoly Balzsay
| SD || 12 
|2009-12-04 || align=left| Sölden
|align=left|
|-align=center
|Won
|17–0
|align=left| Josival Lima Teixeira
| UD || 12 
|2009-08-22 || align=left| Budapest
|align=left|
|-align=center
|Won
|16–0
|align=left| Rubin Williams
| TKO || 5 
|2009-02-07 || align=left| Rostock
|align=left|
|-align=center
|Won
|15–0
|align=left| Christian Pawlak
| UD || 10 
|2008-11-22 || align=left| Rostock
|align=left|
|-align=center
|Won
|14–0
|align=left| Philippe Mendy
| UD || 8 
|2008-08-29 || align=left| Düsseldorf
|align=left|
|-align=center
|Won
|13–0
|align=left| Jose Hilton Dos Santos
| UD || 8 
|2008-05-31 || align=left| Düsseldorf
|align=left|
|-align=center
|Won
|12–0
|align=left| Valentin Antonio Ochoa
| UD || 8 
|2008-03-08 || align=left| Krefeld
|align=left|
|-align=center
|Won
|11–0
|align=left| Laurent Goury
| UD || 8 
|2007-11-13 || align=left| Göppingen
|align=left|
|-align=center
|Won
|10–0
|align=left| Roman Vanicky
| UD || 8 
|2007-09-15 || align=left| Rostock
|align=left|
|-align=center
|Won
|9–0
|align=left| Christian Pawlak
| UD || 6 
|2007-07-14 || align=left| Hamburg
|align=left|
|-align=center
|Won
|8–0
|align=left| Joseph Sovijus
| KO || 2 
|2007-05-18 || align=left| Gifhorn
|align=left|
|-align=center
|Won
|7–0
|align=left| Magid Ben Driss
| UD || 6 
|2007-03-30 || align=left| Cologne
|align=left|
|-align=center
|Won
|6–0
|align=left| Gabor Zsalek
| TKO || 2 
|2007-02-27 || align=left| Cuxhaven
|align=left|
|-align=center
|Won
|5–0
|align=left| Zoltan Kallai
| TKO || 4 
|2007-01-27 || align=left| Düsseldorf
|align=left|
|-align=center
|Won
|4–0
|align=left| Richard Remen
| KO || 1 
|2006-10-21 || align=left| Halle
|align=left|
|-align=center
|Won
|3–0
|align=left| Gabriel Botos
| TKO || 2 
|2006-08-22 || align=left| Hamburg
|align=left|
|-align=center
|Won
|2–0
|align=left| Andrei Staliarou
| KO || 1 
|2006-07-29 || align=left| Oberhausen
|align=left|
|-align=center
|Won
|1–0
|align=left| Lubo Hantak
| UD || 4 
|2006-05-27 || align=left| Munich
|align=left|
|-align=center

References

External links 
Eduard Gutknecht - Profile, News Archive & Current Rankings at Box.Live

1982 births
Living people
Kazakhstani people of German descent
Kazakhstani emigrants to Germany
Citizens of Germany through descent
Russian and Soviet-German people
German male boxers
European Boxing Union champions
Super-middleweight boxers
People with traumatic brain injuries
People with disorders of consciousness